The SFU Red Leafs or Simon Fraser Red Leafs teams (formerly the Simon Fraser Clan) represent Simon Fraser University (SFU), which is located in Burnaby, British Columbia, Canada. The Red Leafs are members of NCAA Division II and are the only Canadian university affiliated with the U.S.-based National Collegiate Athletic Association. The teams previously used the nicknames "Clansmen" and "Clan," which were retired in 2020. In September 2022, the updated nickname "Red Leafs" was announced.

History
SFU's teams formerly played in the National Association of Intercollegiate Athletics of the United States for all sports. In 1997, Simon Fraser sought to join the NCAA of the United States as a Division II school, but was turned down. After this, SFU decided in 2000–01 to partially transfer to Canadian Interuniversity Sport (now U Sports). Before the transfer, SFU did not compete in Canadian football, instead playing American football.

On July 10, 2009, the NCAA approved SFU's bid to join NCAA Division II starting in 2011–12, where SFU intended to compete in the Great Northwest Athletic Conference. However, Canada West, the CIS association that SFU teams were scheduled to play in, issued a probation on all SFU teams for the 2010–11 season, leading to speculation that SFU teams would not have any conference to play in for that season.  The GNAC admitted SFU one year earlier than planned as a full conference member in time for the 2010–11 season. This led to SFU playing American football again, which was the case before they joined the CIS.

Sports sponsored
SFU currently has 17 varsity programs competing in the following sports (affiliations included):
Basketball, men and women (NCAA D2);
Cross-country, men and women (NCAA D2);
Football, men (NCAA D2);
Golf, men and women (NCAA D2);
Soccer, men and women (NCAA D2);
Softball, women (NCAA D2);
Swimming, men and women (NCAA D2);
Track and field, men and women (NCAA D2);
Volleyball, women (NCAA D2);
Wrestling, men (NCAA D2) and women (Women's College Wrestling Association);

SFU is the only school to have finished in the top five of the NAIA division of the NACDA Director's Cup, an award given to the top overall college sports program in the United States, in each year since the award was first given to NAIA schools in 1996. The program won the NAIA Cup consecutively from 1997 through 2001, and again in 2004. The last win was especially impressive because it occurred after SFU partially transferred to CIS.

Oddly, SFU holds the NAIA record for most All-Americans and U.S. National Champions (individual).

Football

The SFU football team has been competing continuously since the athletic department's inception in 1965. The team played by American rules while they competed in the National Association of Intercollegiate Athletics from 1965 to 2001 against other American teams. Along with other SFU teams, the football program transferred to Canadian Interuniversity Sport (now U Sports) and thereby switched to playing Canadian football against Canadian University teams in 2002. While playing in the CIS, SFU won their first and only Hardy Trophy conference championship in 2003 while qualifying for the playoffs twice. After playing eight seasons in the Canada West Conference of the CIS, the football team began competing in the Great Northwest Athletic Conference of NCAA Division II in 2010, thereby playing football by American rules again since then. Over time, most of the GNAC members that had football teams stopped sponsoring the sport, and SFU was eventually left as one of only three GNAC football schools. After the 2021 season, the GNAC shut down its football league, with SFU and the other remaining members joining the Lone Star Conference for that sport.

The team also maintains a cross-town rivalry with the Vancouver-based University of British Columbia Thunderbirds as they are also the only two universities in British Columbia that field football teams. Since 1967, the two teams have competed in the Shrum Bowl, an annual game played at alternating venues with alternating rules. SFU holds a 17–16–1 series lead while UBC is the most recent champion having won the 2022 game at Terry Fox Field. Due to the two schools playing in two different leagues and game formats, the scheduling of these games has often been difficult, with no games being played from 2011-2021, the 12th time the Shrum Bowl had taken a hiatus since the game's inception.

Women's basketball
Team championships:
 2010 CIS National Champions;
 2009 CIS National Champions;
 2007 CIS National Champions;
 2005 CIS National Champions;
 2002 CIS National Champions.

Men's soccer
Team championships and other highlights:
 2021 GNAC Runner-Up;
 2018 GNAC Champion, NCAA Division II Championship Second Round;
 2017 GNAC Champion, NCAA Division II Championship First Round;
 2016 GNAC Champion, NCAA Division II Championship Second Round;
 2015 GNAC Runner-Up;
 2014 NCAA Division II Championship Appearance;
 2013 GNAC Champion, NCAA Division II Final Four appearance;
 2012 GNAC Champion, NCAA Division II Final Four appearance (first non-US school to ever do so);
 2011 GNAC Champion; Ranked №. 1 in the NSCAA Coaches' Poll;
 2010 GNAC Champion; NAIA Final Four appearance;
 2007 NAIA Final Four appearance;
 2005 NAIA Region I Finals;
 2004 NAIA Region I Semi-finals;
 2003 NAIA Region I Champion;
 2002 NAIA Region I Champion;
 1987 NAIA National Finalists;
 1986 NAIA National Finalists;
 1983 NAIA National Champions;
 1982 NAIA National Champions;
 1980 NAIA National Finalists;
 1976 NAIA National Champions;
 1975 NAIA National Finalists;

Women’s soccer

Team championships

 1995 West Region Champions
 1996 West Region Runner-up
 *1996 NAIA National Champions
 1997 West Region Champions
 1997 NAIA National Championship Runner-up
 1998 West Region Champions
 1998 NAIA National Championship Runner-up
 1999 West Region Champions
 1999 NAIA National Championship Runner-up
 2000 West Region Champions
 *2000 NAIA National Champions  *NAIA record Longest Game 162:38 minutes
 2001 West Region Semi finalist
 2003 NAIA National Championships First round
 2004 West Region Champions
 2004 NAIA National Championships Quarterfinals
 2005 West Region Champions
 2005 NAIA National Championships Semifinals
 2008 NAIA National Championships Quarterfinals
 2009 NAIA National Championships First round
 2010 NAIA National Championships First round

Softball 
 
Team championships:

 2010 NAIA National Champions;
 2005 NAIA National Champions;
 2003 NAIA National Champions;
 1999 NAIA National Champions

Wrestling

Olympic gold medalists Carol Huynh and Daniel Igali wrestled collegiately at Simon Fraser.

Club teams 
In addition to its 17 varsity programs, SFU currently has 4 competitive club programmes competing in intercollegiate sport leagues of the following sports (affiliations included):

 Ice hockey, men (BCIHL);
 Field lacrosse, men (MCLA D1);
 Rowing, men and women’s (Rowing Canada);
 Cheerleading (Power Cheerleading Athletics Collegiate Nationals);
 Ultimate Frisbee, open and women's (CUUC).

Men's Ice Hockey 

The men's ice hockey team currently competes in the British Columbia Intercollegiate Hockey League, a five team club hockey league spread across British Columbia and Washington. The team has won the league on four occasions most recently in 2021–22 season during which they went undefeated. The team also regularly plays games against NCAA and U Sports opponents. They compete in a regular cross town rivalry with the neighbouring UBC Thunderbirds. In the summer of 2016 the program began exploring the possibility of moving the program to the NCAA Division 1 level. The men's hockey team also hosts a bi-annual tournament in January called the Great Northwest Showcase involving top NCAA hockey programs.

2012 and 2016 NCAA Championship hosting controversies
After the 2012 regular season, Simon Fraser's men's soccer team was ranked No. 1 in the West Region and earned the right to host the West regional. However, some other schools in the Region immediately filed complaints that some of their personnel did not have passports to enter Canada. As a result, NCAA stripped Simon Fraser of the right to host the regional. Simon Fraser first rented a neutral site in San Francisco, California, as the site of the regional, but the NCAA eventually awarded the right of hosting the remaining matches of the regional to Grand Canyon University, whose men's soccer team was ranked second in the West Region after the 2012 regular season.

After the 2016 regular season, Simon Fraser's men's soccer team was ranked No. 1 once again in the West Region and earned the right to host the West regional once again. However, Simon Fraser was once again forced to rent a neutral site, this time in Seattle, Washington, as the site of the regional.

Mascot 
The official mascot of SFU Athletics is McFogg the Dog, an anthropomorphic Scottish terrier who wears a kilt. McFogg was officially adopted as the University's mascot in 1996 and is named in honour of SFU's inaugural president Patrick McTaggart-Cowan who was nicknamed "McFog". McFogg replaced an unofficial gorilla mascot which the university had previously used since the late 1980s.

References

External links
 

 
Great Northwest Athletic Conference
Sport in Burnaby